The  singles Tournament at the 2006 Gaz de France Stars took place between October 30 and November 5 on indoor hard courts in Hasselt, Belgium.

Kim Clijsters was the home crowd favourite; and emerged as the winner.

Seeds

Draw

Finals

Top half

Bottom half

References

2006 Singles
Gaz de France Stars - Singles
2006 in Belgian tennis
Sport in Hasselt